Cordia monoica, the sandpaper saucer-berry, or snot berry, is a species of flowering tree in the borage family, Boraginaceae, that is native to India, Sri Lanka and in African countries from Sudan, Ethiopia, Somalia, Kenya, Zimbabwe down to South Africa.

References

Zimbabwe flora
India biodiversity
Sandpaper saucer-berry

Afrotropical realm flora
Indomalayan realm flora
monoica